Mount Behling is an ice-covered, flat-topped mountain, 2,190 m, standing between the Steagall and Whitney Glaciers and 5 nautical miles (9 km) north of Mount Ellsworth in the Queen Maud Mountains. First mapped from ground surveys and air photos by the Byrd Antarctic Expedition, 1928–30. Named by Advisory Committee on Antarctic Names (US-ACAN) for Robert E. Behling, United States Antarctic Research Program (USARP) glaciologist on the South Pole—Queen Maud Land Traverse II, summer 1965–66.

Mountains of the Ross Dependency
Amundsen Coast